He-Gassen (Japanese: 屁合戦, literally: "Fart competitions"), or Houhi-Gassen (放屁合戦), are titles given to a Japanese art scroll, created during the Edo period (1603–1868) by an unknown artist or several unknown artists depicting flatulence humor.

He-Gassen is a subject occasionally depicted in Japanese art, first attested at the end of the Heian Period (794–1185). Toba Sōjō (1053–1140), in addition to his famous Scrolls of Frolicking Animals, is also mentioned as having painted scrolls on themes such as "Phallic Contest" and "He-gassen."

Notable examples
 Kachie Emaki (勝得絵巻) (scroll), anonymous (15th century, copy of earlier work), Mitsui Memorial Museum.
 Houhe Gassen Emaki (放屁合戦絵巻) (scroll; 1449, copy of earlier work) Suntory Museum of Art.
 Houhe Gassen Zu (放屁合戦図) (sliding screen) The Museum of Art, Kōchi.
 Houhe Gassen Emaki (放屁合戦絵巻) (two scrolls) by Kawanabe Kyōsai (1867), Kawanabe Kyosai Memorial Museum (in Warabi, Saitama). Separately, a parody by Kyōsai from 1876, bearing the title Fart Contest as Japan Adopts Western Culture Illustrated Scroll (開化放屁合戦絵巻), is in a private collection. 
 Onara Gassen (於那羅合戦) by Ogawa Usen (1921), Fukushima Prefectural Museum of Art.

Waseda University scroll
One scroll in the possession of the Waseda University Library has been digitized. The Waseda University scroll (reproduced in this article) ends (on the far left) with a colophon, stating that this is a 1846 (弘化三丙午) work by "The Fukuyama painter (福山画師) sixty-nine-year-old Airan (六十九歳 相覧)", being a copy of a 1680 (延宝八) original painted by Hishikawa Moronobu. The artist is possibly Murakata Airan (1778–c.1846). The scroll begins the far right, with a scene of men of various ranks (the lacquered black caps indicate court ranks, the others are commoners) spreading the news of the contest, scenes of men passing along the news and carrying baskets of a certain flatulance-inducing foodstuff (taro), and a cooking scene where the food is being prepared and eaten.

References

Further reading

External links 
 Japanese-fart-scrolls
 Digitized scroll at the Waseda University Library
 Japanese fart scrolls prove that human art peaked centuries ago

Edo-period works
Flatulence in popular culture
Japanese paintings
Works of unknown authorship
History of art in Japan